Propenidazole is an antiinfective imidazole derivative used in gynecology.

References

Nitroimidazole antibiotics
Antiprotozoal agents